Changzhi is a prefecture-level city in Shanxi, China.

Changzhi may also refer to:

Changzhi County, in Changzhi, Shanxi, China
Changzhi, Pingtung, township in Pingtung County, Taiwan